Allatoona High School is one of eighteen public high school in the Cobb County School District. The institution opened in the fall of 2008, and is currently the most recent high school in the district. It is located in suburban Acworth, Georgia, north of Atlanta, in the United States. The school is named after the nearby Lake Allatoona.

History
Allatoona High School opened in Fall 2008.

Demographics
The demographic breakdown of the 1,785 students enrolled for the 2019–2020 school year was:
Male - 49.92%
Female - 50.08%
Native American/Alaskan - 0.17%
Asian/Pacific islander - 3.92%
Black - 18.6%
Hispanic - 11.99%
White - 61.68%
Multiracial - 3.64%
In addition, 17.03% of the students qualified for free or reduced-cost lunches.

Athletics

Allatoona is a member of the Georgia High School Association and has won 8 Georgia state championships. Initially with a smaller enrollment which would have seen them in the AA competition classification, all Buccaneers teams except football started in the AAAA classification. For the 2010–11 season, GHSA reclassified Allatoona to AAA. Girls soccer won the school's first state championship for the AAA classification in May 2012 over Columbus High School and ended with a 20-2-1 record.

GHSA reclassified Allatoona again for the 2012–13 season, placing the Buccaneers into AAAAA. In April 2014, the riflery team won the Georgia state championship with a record setting score. The Buccaneers saw their first multi state championship year with two AAAAA titles the following year. Allatoona won the state one-act play championship with Wiley and the Hairyman, while the football team beat Glynn Academy at the Georgia Dome to cap a 14–1 season. The football program, highlighted by this season, was named as the 2010–2019 Team of the Decade by the Marietta Daily Journal.

2016 saw lacrosse win the program's first state championship in the A-AAAAA category with a 9–7 win over Westminster. Allatoona continued its ascent with GHSA's reclassification to 6A for the 2016–17 season. The Buccaneers responded with the school's first ever back-to-back state championships with the boys track performances in 2017 and 2018. November 2019 marked the third 6A state championship when girls volleyball beat Sequoyah High School in five sets.

Notable alumni
 Clarke Schmidt, professional baseball player
 Raleigh Webb, professional football player

References

External links
 

Public high schools in Georgia (U.S. state)
Schools in Cobb County, Georgia
Educational institutions established in 2008
2008 establishments in Georgia (U.S. state)